deugro is a German-based privately held company specialising in heavy transport and lifting, including transportation and installation of heavy cargo.

History
Deugro was founded in 1924 in Germany. As of 2015, the company currently operates in 35 countries and has over 70 offices and approximately 3,000  employees around the world.

References

Transport companies of Germany
Heavy haulage
Privately held companies of Germany
Transport companies established in 1924
1924 establishments in Germany
German companies established in 1924